Arcoptilia is a genus of moths in the family Pterophoridae.

Species
Arcoptilia gizan Arenberger, 1985
Arcoptilia pongola Ustjuzhanin et Kovtunovich, 2010

Exelastini
Moth genera